Uttarapurana is a Jain text composed by Acharya Gunabhadra in the 9th century CE. According to the Digambara Uttarapurana text, Mahavira was born in Kundpur in the Kingdom of the Videhas.

The narration in Uttarapurana continues the account in Mahapurana, written by Acharya Jinasena and completed by Gunabhadra.

References

Citations

Sources
 
 

Jain texts